Kim Sung-gyu is a Korean name consisting of the family name Kim and the given name Sung-gyu, and may also refer to:

 Kim Sung-kyu (born 1989), South Korean singer known as Sunggyu
 Kim Sung-kyu (actor) (born 1986), South Korean actor